Judas Priest are an English heavy metal band formed in Birmingham in 1969. They have sold over 50 million albums and are frequently ranked as one of the greatest metal bands of all time. Despite an innovative and pioneering body of work in the latter half of the 1970s, the band had struggled with indifferent record production and a lack of major commercial success until 1980, when they rose to commercial success with the album British Steel.

The band's membership has seen much turnover, including a revolving cast of drummers in the 1970s and the departure of singer Rob Halford in 1992. Tim "Ripper" Owens, formerly of Winter's Bane, replaced Halford in 1996 and recorded two albums with Judas Priest, before Halford returned to the band in 2003. The current line-up consists of Halford, guitarists Glenn Tipton and Richie Faulkner, bassist Ian Hill and drummer Scott Travis. The band's best-selling album is 1982's Screaming for Vengeance, with their most commercially successful line-up featuring Hill, Halford, Tipton, guitarist K. K. Downing, and drummer Dave Holland. Although not original members, Tipton and Hill are the only two of the band to appear on every album.

Halford's operatic vocal style and the twin guitar sound of Downing and Tipton have been a major influence on heavy metal bands. Judas Priest's image of leather, spikes, and other taboo articles of clothing were widely influential during the glam metal era of the 1980s. The Guardian referred to British Steel as the record that defines heavy metal. Despite a decline in exposure during the mid-1990s, the band has once again seen a resurgence, including worldwide tours, being inaugural inductees into the VH1 Rock Honors in 2006, receiving a Grammy Award for Best Metal Performance in 2010, and having their songs featured in video games such as Guitar Hero and the Rock Band series. In 2022, Judas Priest were inducted into the Rock and Roll Hall of Fame. As of 2023, longtime touring guitarist Andy Sneap becomes an official member of Judas Priest via Rob Halford.

History

Origins (1969–1974) 
Judas Priest was formed in 1969 in Birmingham, England, by lead vocalist Al Atkins and bassist Brian "Bruno" Stapenhill, with John Perry on guitars and John "Fezza" Partridge on drums. Perry committed suicide at age 18, and amongst the replacements the band auditioned was future Judas Priest guitarist Kenny "K. K." Downing; at the time, they turned him down in favour of 17-year-old multi-instrumentalist Ernest Chataway, who had played with Birmingham band Black Sabbath when they were still called Earth. Stapenhill came up with the name Judas Priest from Bob Dylan's song "The Ballad of Frankie Lee and Judas Priest" on the album John Wesley Harding. Partridge was replaced in 1970 by drummer Fred Woolley, who later re-joined Chataway and Stapenhill in the band Bullion. No member of that early line-up lasted long enough to play on the band's recordings, though several songs co-written by Atkins appeared on their first two albums.

The band recorded a two-song demo "Good Time Woman" and "We'll Stay Together" and eventually gained a three-album recording contract with the label Immediate in late 1969 after a gig in Walsall, but the label went out of business before an album could be recorded, and the band split in 1970. Late in the year, Atkins found a heavy rock band called Freight rehearsing without a singer, made up of K. K. Downing on guitars, his childhood friend Ian "Skull" Hill on bass, and drummer John Ellis. He joined them, and they took on Atkins' defunct band's name. Their first gig was on 6 March 1971. Ellis quit later that year and was replaced with Alan Moore. Early shows included Hendrix and Quatermass covers, and in 1972, the set list included the originals "Never Satisfied", "Winter", and the show-closer "Caviar and Meths". July 1971 also saw them making a 45 rpm demo of "Mind Conception" with "Holy is the Man" on the B side for the Zella Records label.

Moore left and was replaced with Chris "Congo" Campbell (born Christopher Louis Campbell, 19 December 1952, Birmingham) and the band joined the management agency of Black Sabbath guitarist Tony Iommi, Iommi Management Agency. Atkins continued to write material for the band—including "Whiskey Woman", which became the base for the Judas Priest staple "Victim of Changes"—but as finances were tight and he had a family to support, he played his last gigs with the band in December 1972. Campbell left soon afterwards, later to surface in the band Machine, and the band enlisted two members of the band Hiroshima: drummer John Hinch and vocalist Rob Halford, the brother of Hill's girlfriend. Halford and Hinch played their first show with Judas Priest in May 1973 at The Townhouse in Wellington. The show was recorded and part of it released in 2019 on the compilation "Downer-Rock Asylum" on the Audio Archives label along with one live song from the Atkins era.

Judas Priest made their first tour of continental Europe in early 1974 and they returned to England that April to sign a recording deal with the label Gull. Gull suggested adding a fifth member to fill in the band's sound; they took on as a second lead guitarist Glenn Tipton, whose group The Flying Hat Band were also managed by Iommi's agency.

Rocka Rolla (1974–1975) 
Judas Priest went into the studio in June–July 1974 with Black Sabbath producer Rodger Bain. The band released their debut single "Rocka Rolla" that August and followed in September with an album of the same name. The album features a variety of styles—straight-up rock, heavy riffing, and progressive.

Technical problems during the recording contributed to the poor sound quality of the record. Producer Rodger Bain, whose resume included Black Sabbath's first three albums as well as Budgie's first album, dominated the production of the album and made decisions with which the band did not agree. Bain also chose to leave fan favourites from the band's live set, such as "Tyrant", "Genocide" and "The Ripper", off the album and he cut the song "Caviar and Meths" from a 10-minute song down to a 2-minute instrumental.

The tour for Rocka Rolla was Judas Priest's first international tour with dates in Germany, the Netherlands, Norway and Denmark including one show at Hotel Klubben in Tønsberg, one hour from Oslo, Norway, which scored them a somewhat negative review in the local press. The album flopped upon release, leaving Priest in dire financial straits. Priest attempted to secure a deal with Gull Records to get a monthly pay of £50, however, because Gull Records were struggling as well, they declined.

Sad Wings of Destiny (1975–1977) 
The band performed "Rocka Rolla" on BBC Two's The Old Grey Whistle Test in 1975, as well as the "Dreamer Deceiver"–"Deceiver" pair the year before the songs appeared on Sad Wings of Destiny. Hinch left the band for reasons that are disputed and was replaced with Alan Moore, who returned to the band in October 1975. Finances were tight: band members restricted themselves to one meal a day—and several took on part-time work—while they recorded their follow-up album on a budget of £2,000. The group intended to make an album mixing straight-ahead rock with a progressive edge.

The band recorded Sad Wings of Destiny over two weeks in November and December 1975 at Rockfield Studios in Wales. The band stayed sober during the 12-hour recording sessions. The cover depicts a struggling, grounded angel surrounded by flames and wearing a devil's three-pronged cross, which became the band's symbol. The album was released in March 1976, with "The Ripper" as lead single. The band supported the album with a headlining tour of the UK from April to June 1976. By this time Halford joked that fans should burn their copies of Rocka Rolla.

Fans, critics, and the band have since come to see Sad Wings of Destiny as the album on which Judas Priest consolidated their sound and image. It features heavy riffing and complex song arrangements that Tipton and Downing have said were inspired by the factories of The Black Country. The album's centrepiece "Victim of Changes" evolved from a combination of Atkins' "Whiskey Woman" and Halford's "Red Light Woman", and went on to become a fan favourite.

The band grew dissatisfied with Gull; the tight finances led Moore to leave the band a second time—this time permanently. The signing required breaking their contract with Gull, resulting in the rights to the first two albums and all related recordings—including demos—becoming property of Gull. Gull periodically repackaged and re-released the material from these albums.

Major label debut (1977–1979) 
Judas Priest recorded their major-label debut, Sin After Sin, in January 1977 at The Who's Ramport Studios, with Deep Purple bassist Roger Glover as producer. Moore left again during the sessions and was replaced with session drummer Simon Phillips. The album features significant developments in heavy metal technique, in particular its use of double-kick drumming on tracks such as "Dissident Aggressor", and includes a pop-metal cover of "Diamonds & Rust" by folk singer Joan Baez.

Sin After Sin appeared in April 1977. It was the first Priest record under a major label, CBS, and the first of eleven consecutive albums to be certified Gold or higher by the RIAA. Phillips declined to become a permanent member of Judas Priest, so the band hired Les Binks on Glover's recommendation. Together, they recorded 1978's Stained Class, produced by Dennis MacKay, and Killing Machine (released in America as Hell Bent for Leather). Binks, credited with co-writing "Beyond the Realms of Death", now regarded as one of the band's classics, was an accomplished and technically skilled drummer and his addition added a dexterous edge to the band's sound. Binks also played on Unleashed in the East (1979), which was recorded live in Japan during the Killing Machine tour. While the first three Judas Priest albums had considerable traces of Black Sabbath, Led Zeppelin, and Deep Purple in them, as well as ballads, Stained Class did not contain any ballads aside from "Beyond the Realms of Death". Killing Machine was the first nod to a more commercial sound, with simpler songs that brought back some blues influences. At about the same time, the band members adopted their now-famous "leather-and-studs" image.

Mainstream success years (1979–1991) 

Following the release of Killing Machine (1978) was the live release from the supporting tour, Unleashed in the East (1979). It was the first of many Judas Priest albums to go platinum. There was some criticism of the band's use of studio enhancements and overdubbing in what was marketed as a live album. By this point the playing style of the band had grown progressively heavier, with live versions of songs such as "Exciter", "Tyrant" and "Diamonds and Rust" sounding much heavier and faster than their studio counterparts.

Les Binks quit in late 1979, as he was unhappy with the band's manager Mike Dolan's decision not to pay him for his performance on the live album, so they replaced him with Dave Holland, formerly of the band Trapeze. With this line-up, Judas Priest recorded six studio and one live album, which garnered different degrees of critical and financial success.

In 1980, the band released British Steel. The songs were shorter and had more mainstream radio hooks, but retained the familiar heavy metal feel. Tracks such as "United", "Breaking the Law", and "Living After Midnight" were frequently played on the radio. The next release, 1981's Point of Entry, followed the same formula, and the tour in support of the album featured new songs such as "Solar Angels" and "Heading Out to the Highway".

The 1982 album Screaming for Vengeance featured "You've Got Another Thing Comin'", which became a major radio hit in the US. Songs such as "Electric Eye" and "Riding on the Wind" also appeared on this album, and proved to be popular live. "(Take These) Chains" (by Bob Halligan Jr) was released as a single and received heavy airplay. This album went Double Platinum.

On 29 May 1983, the band played on Heavy Metal Day of the US Festival, a music festival in San Bernardino, California sponsored by Steve Wozniak. The band was fourth in the line-up that also included Quiet Riot, Mötley Crüe, Ozzy Osbourne, Triumph, Scorpions, and Van Halen.

Priest continued their success through the mid-1980s. "Freewheel Burning", released in 1983, was a regular on rock radio. Its album Defenders of the Faith was released the following year. Some critics dubbed it "Screaming for Vengeance II", due to its musical similarity to the previous album.

On 13 July 1985, Judas Priest, along with Black Sabbath and other performers, played Live Aid at JFK Stadium in Philadelphia. Their setlist was "Living After Midnight", "The Green Manalishi (With the Two-Pronged Crown)" and "(You've Got) Another Thing Comin'".

Turbo was released in April 1986. The band adopted a more colourful stage look and gave their music a more mainstream feel by adding guitar synthesizers. The album also went Platinum and had a successful arena tour in support, with 100 concerts in North America, Europe and Japan in 1986. A live album recorded on the tour, titled Priest...Live!, was released the next year, offering live tracks from the era. The video documentary Heavy Metal Parking Lot was created by Jeff Krulik and John Heyn in 1986. It documents the heavy metal fans waiting on 31 May 1986 for a Judas Priest concert (with special guests Dokken) at the Capital Center (later renamed US Airways Arena) in Landover, Maryland.

In May 1988, Ram It Down was released, featuring several reworked songs left over from Turbo, in addition to new songs. The band recorded three tracks with pop producers Stock-Aitken-Waterman: two originals, "Runaround" and "I Will Return", and a cover of The Stylistics' hit "You Are Everything". Producer Matt Aitken said of the sessions, "I think it was ill-conceived, it was unlikely it was going to work. But we went into it with the spirit of optimism, and we did the best with them, within the parameters within which we would be prepared to work. We weren't going to use live drum kits and stuff, and that probably made it a no go from the start. I have no idea why we were working with Judas Priest really, but I think we made a good fist of a heavy metal song. I think it sounded alright." The tracks were ultimately not included on this album due to a management decision. 

A reviewer has called Ram It Down a "stylistic evolution" that resulted from the band's "attempt to rid themselves of the tech synthesiser approach ... and return to the traditional metal of their fading glory days". The reviewer argued the album showed "how far behind they were lagging ... the thrashers they helped influence" in earlier years. In 1989, longtime drummer Dave Holland left the band.

In September 1990, the Painkiller album used a new drummer, Scott Travis (formerly from Racer X), who gave the band an edgier sound thanks to his heavy use of double pedals. This comeback album also dropped the 1980s-style synthesisers for all songs except "A Touch of Evil". The tour used bands such as Annihilator, Megadeth, Pantera, Sepultura and Testament as opening bands, and culminated in the Rock in Rio performance in Brazil in front of 100,000+ fans.

Part of the Judas Priest stage show often featured Halford riding onstage on a Harley-Davidson motorbike, dressed in motorcycle leathers and sunglasses. During a Toronto show in August 1991, Halford was seriously injured as he rode on stage, when he collided with a drum riser hidden behind clouds of dry ice mist. Though the show was delayed, he performed the set before going to a hospital. Hill later noted "he must have been in agony". In a 2007 interview, Halford claimed the accident had nothing to do with his departure from the band.

Subliminal message trial 
In 1990, Judas Priest was the subject of civil action in the United States which alleged that the band was responsible for an incident in Sparks, Nevada, in 1985 in which 20-year-old James Vance and 18-year-old Raymond Belknap shot themselves. On the evening of 23 December 1985, Vance and Belknap went to a church playground with a 12-gauge shotgun with the purpose of committing suicide. They had consumed alcohol and marijuana earlier that evening. The lawsuit alleged that the pair had been listening to Judas Priest's 1978 album Stained Class that night. Belknap was the first to place the shotgun under his chin, and died instantly after pulling the trigger. Some time later, Vance also shot himself, but succeeded only in disfiguring himself by blowing away the lower half of his face. Vance died three years later of a suspected drug overdose.

Lawyers representing the Belknap and Vance families alleged that a subliminal message urging them to "do it" had been embedded in the song "Better by You, Better than Me", a cover of a 1969 Spooky Tooth song. Judas Priest had recorded the cover at the urging of their record company after the rest of Stained Class had been completed. Plaintiffs alleged that this subliminal command was the trigger which led directly to the pair deciding to shoot themselves. Vance's parents claimed that their son had been troubled for a long time prior to the suicide pact, but had recently "changed for the better" and had re-embraced his family's Christian faith before the "garbage music" of Judas Priest had again led him astray. The trial lasted from 16 July to 24 August 1990, when the lawsuit was dismissed by the judge, who ruled that the so-called subliminal message "was a coincidental convergence of a guitar chord with an exhalation pattern". One of the defense witnesses, Dr. Timothy E. Moore, wrote an article for Skeptical Inquirer chronicling the trial. The trial was covered in a 1991 documentary film, Dream Deceivers: The Story Behind James Vance Vs. Judas Priest.

Halford's departure and Ripper years (1991–2003)
After the Painkiller Tour in 1991, Halford left Judas Priest. In September 1991, there were indications of internal tensions within the band. Halford went on to form a street-style thrash metal group named Fight, with Scott Travis on drums for the recording sessions. He formed this band to explore new musical territory, but due to contractual obligations, he remained with Judas Priest until May 1992. In his 2020 memoir Confess, Halford blamed his departure on a ‘miscommunication’, rather than an intentional desire to quit the band.

Halford collaborated with Judas Priest in the release of a compilation album entitled Metal Works '73–'93 to commemorate their 20th anniversary. He also appeared in a video by the same title, documenting their history, in which his departure from the band was officially announced later that year.

Tim "Ripper" Owens, who had previously sung in Winter's Bane and a Judas Priest tribute band called British Steel, was hired in 1996 as Judas Priest's new singer. This line-up released two studio albums, Jugulator in 1997 (in 1999, the song "Bullet Train" was nominated for a Grammy Award for Best Metal Performance) and Demolition in 2001. A considerable stylistic departure from prior releases, the former has been characterised as groove metal and the latter as nu metal, both receiving mixed reviews. The line-up also gave rise to two live double-albums – '98 Live Meltdown and Live in London (2003), the latter of which had a live DVD counterpart.

In a February 1998 interview on MTV, Halford came out as gay.

Reunion and Angel of Retribution (2003–2006) 

After eleven years apart, faced with an ever-growing demand for a reunion, Judas Priest and Rob Halford announced they would reunite in July 2003, to coincide with the release of the Metalogy box set (despite Halford's earlier insistence that he "would never do it"). They did a concert tour in Europe in 2004, and co-headlined the 2004 Ozzfest, being named as the "premier act" by almost all US media coverage of the event. Judas Priest and "Ripper" Owens parted amicably, with Owens joining American heavy metal band Iced Earth.

A new studio album, Angel of Retribution, was released on 1 March 2005 (US) on Sony Music/Epic Records to critical and commercial success, earning the band a 2005 Metal Hammer Golden Gods Award for Best Album. A global tour in support of the album ensued. As for the band Halford, writing for the fourth release was cut off. After the Retribution tour in June 2006, however, Halford announced he would create his own record company, Metal God Entertainment, where he would release all his solo material under his own control. In November 2006 he remastered his back catalogue and released it exclusively through Apple's iTunes Store. Two new songs allegedly set for the fourth release, "Forgotten Generation" and "Drop Out", were released through iTunes as well.

Along with Queen, Kiss and Def Leppard, Judas Priest was an inaugural inductee into the "VH1 Rock Honors". The ceremony took place 25 May 2006 in Las Vegas, Nevada, and first aired on 31 May. Their presentation was preceded by Godsmack performing a medley of "Electric Eye"/"Victim of Changes"/"Hell Bent for Leather." Judas Priest then played "Breaking the Law", "The Green Manalishi (With the Two Prong Crown)" and "You've Got Another Thing Comin'", before which Halford rode a Harley onstage.

Nostradamus (2006–2010) 
In a June 2006 interview with MTV.com, Halford said of the group's concept album about the 16th-century French writer Nostradamus, "Nostradamus is all about metal, isn't he? He was an alchemist as well as a seer – a person of extraordinary talent. He had an amazing life that was full of trial and tribulation and joy and sorrow. He's a very human character and a world-famous individual. You can take his name and translate it into any language and everybody knows about him, and that's important because we're dealing with a worldwide audience." In addition to digging new lyrical ground for the band, the album would contain musical elements which might surprise fans. "It's going to have a lot of depth", Halford said. "There'll be a lot of symphonic elements. We might orchestrate it, without it being overblown. There may be a massive choir at parts and keyboards will be featured more prominently, whereas they've always been in the background before." The album Nostradamus was released in June 2008; the band began a support tour in that same month.

In early February 2009, the band joined the ranks of bands speaking out against ticket-touting ("scalping"), issuing a statement condemning the practice of selling tickets at well above face value, and urging fans to buy tickets only from official sources. In the same month, Judas Priest continued their tour, bringing their "Priest Feast" (with guests Megadeth and Testament) to multiple arenas in England, Wales, Scotland, and Ireland in February and March 2009. From there the tour progressed to multiple venues in Sweden. Later in March, Judas Priest performed in Portugal (at Lisbon on the Atlantic Pavilion), which they had not visited since 2005. The tour then continued to Milan, Italy, and then Paris, France; Halford had last performed with Judas Priest in Paris in 1991.

From June through August 2009, Judas Priest completed a North American tour to commemorate the 30th anniversary of the release of British Steel (1980); the album was performed in its entirety on each tour date, with some other songs thrown in. This tour was to be a joint effort with fellow Englishman David Coverdale and Whitesnake. Unfortunately, Whitesnake would have to leave the tour after the show in Denver, Colorado on 11 August 2009 due to Coverdale falling ill with a serious throat infection; he was advised to stop singing immediately to avoid permanently damaging his vocal cords.

On 14 July 2009, Judas Priest released a new live album, featuring 11 previously unreleased live tracks from the 2005 and 2008 world tours, A Touch of Evil: Live. The performance of "Dissident Aggressor" won the 2010 Grammy Award for Best Metal Performance.

In May 2010, Halford said the band had been offered a star on the Hollywood Walk of Fame, but "we've just never been there when they wanted to do the ceremony." He also revealed that a Nostradamus tour was still being contemplated: "We were in Hollywood recently and met with some producers and agents, so there are a lot of things going on behind the scenes."

Downing's retirement and Epitaph World Tour (2010–2011) 
Judas Priest announced on 7 December 2010, that their Epitaph World Tour would be the band's farewell tour and would run up until 2012. In a January 2011 interview, Halford said about the band's impending retirement: "I think it's time, you know. We're not the first band to say farewell, it's just the way everyone comes to at some point and we're gonna say a few more things early next year, so I think the main thing that we just want to ask everybody to consider is don't be sad about this, start celebrating and rejoicing over all the great things we've done in Judas Priest."

On 27 January 2011, it was announced that Judas Priest was in the process of writing new material; the band also clarified their plans for the future, saying, "this is by no means the end of the band. In fact, we are presently writing new material, but we do intend this to be the last major world tour." Speaking at a press conference in Los Angeles on 26 May of the new material Glenn Tipton said: "It's quite a mixed bag. Really, there's more sentiment on this album. In a way, I suppose, it's also our farewell album, although it might not be our last one. There are some anthems on there, which pay tribute to our fans".

On 20 April 2011, it was announced that K. K. Downing had retired from the band and would not complete the Epitaph World Tour. Downing cited differences with the band and the management, and a breakdown in their relationship. Richie Faulkner, guitarist for Lauren Harris' band, was announced as his replacement for the Epitaph World Tour. Downing's retirement left bassist Ian Hill as the only remaining founder member of the band.

On 25 May 2011, Judas Priest played during the finale of American Idol season 10 with James Durbin, making it their first live performance without K.K. Downing. The band played a mixture of two songs: "Living After Midnight" and "Breaking the Law".

On 7 June 2011, the band announced that it planned to release the box set Single Cuts, a collection of singles, the following August.

Redeemer of Souls (2011–2015) 
In an August 2011 interview with Billboard, Halford explained that he and Tipton had "about 12 or 14 tracks completely mapped out" for a new studio album, with four of those tracks already recorded and mixed. The band made a point to take its time with the album, with Halford explaining "I'm of the attitude it'll be ready when it's ready ... I don't think we're going to slack off. We're determined to do a lot of work and be just as dedicated as we've always been and take a lot of care and attention with all the songs. We're not going to just bang this one out, so to speak."

On 13 September 2011, Priest announced its plans to release a new compilation album, The Chosen Few, a set of Priest songs chosen by other iconic heavy metal musicians.

On 5 June 2013, Halford confirmed that the Epitaph World Tour would not be the band's final tour. On 22 December, Judas Priest released a short Christmas message on their official website, which confirmed that they would be releasing their next album in 2014.

On 17 March 2014 at the Ronnie James Dio Awards in Los Angeles, Halford announced that the band's 17th studio album was finished. On 28 April, the band released the album's title track "Redeemer of Souls" for streaming on their official website. On 14 May 2014, the band's original guitarist Ernie Chataway died at the age of 62 from cancer, as reported by vocalist Al Atkins. Redeemer of Souls was released on 8 July 2014. It sold around 32,000 copies in the United States in its first week of release to land at position No. 6 on The Billboard 200 chart, the band's highest charting position in the US after the double-disc concept album, Nostradamus, debuted at No. 11. This was the band's first top 10 album in the US. The band went on tour in support of the album which ran from 1 October 2014 until 17 December 2015. The Redeemer of Souls Tour led to the sixth live album Battle Cry, which was released on 25 March 2016 after being recorded at the Wacken Open Air festival in Germany on 1 August 2015.

Firepower and Tipton's retirement from touring (2015–2019) 

In a November 2015 interview with Reverb.com, Richie Faulkner said that the band would start work on their eighteenth studio album in 2016. In April 2016, Loudwire posted a photo showing Rob Halford, Glenn Tipton and Faulkner himself in the studio beginning the process of the album, with Halford confirming in a radio interview that it would be ready by early 2017. During an interview at the 2016 edition of the Rock 'n' Roll Fantasy Camp, Halford expressed dissatisfaction on making an album similar to Redeemer of Souls. Faulkner then stated that the band would begin recording in January 2017 and also said that they would not go on tour until 2018.

In March 2017, the band entered the studio to begin the recording process, with support from long time producer Tom Allom, along with former Sabbat guitarist and producer Andy Sneap and engineer Mike Exeter, who worked with the band on the previous album. This marked the first time since 1988's Ram It Down that they had worked with Allom. In an April 2017 interview with Planet Rock, Halford said that the band was "coming to some of the final moments" of completion of the new album. He also promised "a very exciting 2018 period" with a world tour taking place in 2018. In an Instagram post in June 2017, Sneap said that the band completed tracking.

The eighteenth album, Firepower, was released on 9 March 2018, with a world tour taking place thereafter, beginning in North America with Saxon and Black Star Riders as their support acts.

On 12 February 2018, Glenn Tipton revealed that he had Parkinson's disease and would step down from touring. According to the band, the disease's progression left him unable to play the more challenging material. Tipton stated that he was still a member of the band despite his diagnosis and did not rule out future on-stage appearances. Andy Sneap was then announced as his replacement for the tour. Richie Faulkner later assured fans that Tipton would perform with the band "at some point in the tour." At the 20 March 2018 show in Newark, New Jersey, Tipton joined the band on stage to perform "Metal Gods", "Breaking the Law" and "Living After Midnight", then "Victim of Changes" and "No Surrender" on later dates. He continued to appear for encores throughout the remainder of the Firepower World Tour.

On 29 January 2019, Judas Priest's European tour with Ozzy Osbourne was cancelled after Osbourne experienced a severe upper-respiratory infection. The band later confirmed that the tour was rescheduled to 2020.

Upcoming 19th studio album and 50th anniversary (2019–present) 
In a March 2019 interview with Australia's May the Rock Be With You, Rob Halford stated that Judas Priest would "definitely" release a new studio album in the future, and that Tipton had already started composing riffs. Bassist Ian Hill said that the band had "some very strong ideas that were left out of Firepower which we never got around to completing. So it's very much on the cards. When that will happen, I don't know." Halford expressed uncertainty as well on when a new album would be made, but assured it would happen. Despite Tipton's condition, Faulkner said that he would "very much be involved in the creation of the next record." Halford later confirmed that the band began compiling ideas for the next album, but said that Firepower would be difficult to top. He then said that the writing sessions would begin in early 2020, and that there would not be new material that year.

On 15 January 2020, Faulkner revealed via Twitter that he, Tipton and Halford would meet up in February 2020 to begin work on the next album. The songwriting process commenced on 3 February 2020. Halford confirmed that Andy Sneap and Tom Allom would return to contribute to its production. Prior to the COVID-19 lockdowns, Faulkner said that a month's worth of songs were written, but incomplete, and that the band would eventually begin composing material. Halford said that Tipton contributed material during the writing process, describing the songs as "monsters. Even in a very, very rough, primitive stage, they're great — they're really, really good." He explained that the album would capture "the emotion of what we're going through together." In regards to recording the songs, he dismissed the idea of doing so via Zoom, citing his old school lifestyle of being in the studio with the band members to write and record music in normal fashion.

Judas Priest were originally scheduled to embark on the 50 Heavy Metal Years Tour in 2020 in Europe and North America, but was pushed back to 2021 due to the COVID-19 pandemic; however, due to its continued presence, the European leg was pushed back to 2022. They returned to the stage on 15 August 2021 as they headlined the Bloodstock Open Air festival, once again rejoined by Tipton for the encore songs. The tour commenced on 8 September; however, the remainder of the US Tour was postponed as Faulkner was hospitalized for major medical heart condition issues. It was rescheduled for the spring of 2022 with Queensrÿche as their support band, while the European leg with Ozzy Osbourne was rescheduled for 2023.

On 29 April 2021, former drummer John Hinch died at the age of 73, as confirmed by Halford on Instagram. When speaking about the upcoming album, Halford said that the band had "a bunch of great new ideas for tracks, lots of really strong demos", describing it as being "a potent record". In regards to the material they had written, bassist Ian Hill said that there was enough for at least an album or two, expressing doubt that it would be released before 2023 due to the band's tour schedule. Halford confirmed Tipton's appearance on the album.

In January 2022, Judas Priest announced the departure of Andy Sneap as he would shift his focus on his production work while the band continued as a quartet; however, the decision was retracted and he was reinstated. In regards to the album's musical direction, Faulkner and Halford said that it would take a more progressive approach than Firepower. Tipton assured that it would be "what every Priest fan will want", while explaining that the tracks may or may not fancy the fans taste, but expressed satisfaction in its sound. Faulkner confirmed that the drum parts were recorded, and that the album was completely written, "but we need to record it properly and everything like that. So it's not really anywhere near done. But when it's done, it's done." In June 2022, Halford indicated that the album would not be released until 2023 or 2024. In January 2023, Halford said the album would be released in 2024.

On 5 November 2022, Judas Priest were inducted into the Rock and Roll Hall of Fame, playing a 3 song set alongside former members K.K. Downing and Les Binks.

Musical style and influence

Musical style 
Judas Priest's style has always been rooted in heavy metal, and many of their albums reflect diverse aspects of the genre. For example, their first album, Rocka Rolla (1974), is primarily rooted in heavy blues rock. From Sad Wings of Destiny (1976) through Stained Class (1978), their style was somewhat progressive, with complex guitar passages and poetic lyrics. Songs would often shift in dynamics and tempo, and the music was some of the heaviest of its day. This would later have a major influence on progressive metal and stoner rock bands. 1977's Sin After Sin used a combination of double bass drum (or "double kick") and rapid 16th-note bass rhythms combined with rapid 16th-note guitar rhythms used by Black Sabbath, Venom, and Motörhead that came to define the genre. While the double-bass rhythms of Judas Priest are generally measured and technical, the song "Dissident Aggressor" (1977) pushed an increase in "tempo and aggression" which was later adopted by other bands with a much harder-edged approach.

Starting with their fifth album, Killing Machine (1978), the band began to incorporate a more commercial, radio-friendly style to their music. British Steel has been referred to as the "record that, more than any other, codified what we mean by heavy metal". The lyrics and music were simplified, and this style prevailed up to their seventh album, Point of Entry (1981). With their eighth album, Screaming for Vengeance (1982), the band incorporated a balance of these two styles. This continued on Defenders of the Faith (1984). With the follow-up album, Turbo (1986), the band incorporated guitar synthesizers into its signature heavy metal sound. On 1988's Ram It Down the band retained some of the more commercial qualities of Turbo but also returned to some of the fast tempo heavy metal found on their earlier works. This fast-tempo style continued with 1990's Painkiller. Jugulator (1997) tried to incorporate some of the 1990s contemporary groove metal styles. Demolition (2001) has a more traditional heavy metal sound with nu metal elements. Following the return of Halford for Angel of Retribution and Nostradamus, the band returned to the style of its early albums.

The band's popularity and status as one of the exemplary and influential heavy metal bands has earned them the nickname "Metal Gods" from their song of the same name.

Vocal style and influences 
Halford listened to and was influenced by Little Richard, Elvis Presley, Janis Joplin and Robert Plant as a vocalist. He learned to push to the limits of his vocal abilities by their vocal demonstrations on record. He developed a powerful, operatic vocal style with an impressive range from lower throaty growls to ear-piercing high screams with strong vibrato. He was also a fan of Freddie Mercury, referring to him as his ultimate hero.

Media recognition and legacy
Judas Priest have influenced a great deal of metal music since the late 1970s. They were ranked by MTV as the second "Greatest Metal Band" of all time (after Black Sabbath), and VH1 named them the 78th greatest artist of all time in 2010. They were nominated for induction into the Rock and Roll Hall of Fame in 2018, but were passed over despite placing among the top 5 fan-voted nominees.

The band has sold over 50 million records so far, having 11 top 30 albums in the United Kingdom.

Many metal bands have named themselves after classic era Judas Priest songs and albums, including Sinner, Exciter, Rage, Running Wild, Steeler and Tyrant.

Fashion 
In addition to the sound, Judas Priest is also known for being revolutionary in heavy metal fashion. In the band's early years, they dressed in hippie-style 1970s outfits, but as the decade drew to a close, the rise of punk rock made this look outdated, so the band began wearing simplified wardrobes on their 1978 tour. For the 1979 tour, Halford adopted his now-trademark leather-and-studs look, inspired by punk fashion and leather culture. The rest of the band adopted a similar style which became prominent at the time of their 1978 release, Killing Machine. This style would go on to be adopted by many heavy metal bands in the early 1980s, especially those of the NWOBHM and early black metal movements. To this day, it is not uncommon to find metal artists and fans sporting such a look at concerts.

In a published quote on the back cover of K. K. Downing's autobiography Heavy Duty: Days and Nights in Judas Priest, Downing said that Judas Priest "had a bit of an identity crisis from the beginning. There was always a bit of a question mark about the band's look. To me, it never seemed to say anything—and in the earliest days of our career, I suppose I actually saw that as a good thing."

Downing claims that he was the one who came up with the band's black-leather look back when he first started in the music business. He explains, "I had this Heavy Metal attitude inside of me. I had it all of my life. When I got into Judas Priest I knew I had a band that had a great name. I knew we were a great band ... but something was not quite complete. The leather and studs image came along and it all started to complete itself. We had the album cover with the razor blade ... and Heavy Metal was born, mate. I was a youngster and it came to me. Around 1976 is when it happened. The band took to it and got on with it, really."

In popular culture 
The American director Rob Reiner went to see Judas Priest in concert as part of his preparation for making the film This Is Spinal Tap (1984), which spoofs British heavy metal bands.

The drama-comedy film Rock Star (2001), starring Mark Wahlberg, is loosely based on the story of how Tim "Ripper" Owens replaced Rob Halford as the vocalist in Judas Priest.

On 5 January 2014, the band appeared in the episode "Steal This Episode" of comedy cartoon show The Simpsons playing a parody of their song "Breaking the Law". Their music was referred to as "death metal", for which the producers subsequently apologised by having Bart Simpson write "Judas Priest is not 'Death Metal in the opening sequence chalkboard gag.

Band members

Current members
 Ian Hill – bass, backing vocals (1969–present)
 Rob Halford – lead vocals (1973–1992, 2003–present)
 Glenn Tipton – guitars, backing vocals, keyboards (1974–present) (limited touring due to illness since 2018)
 Scott Travis – drums, occasional backing vocals (1989–present)
 Richie Faulkner – guitars, backing vocals (2011–present)
 Andy Sneap – guitars, backing vocals (touring 2018–present)

Discography

Studio albums
Rocka Rolla (1974)
Sad Wings of Destiny (1976)
Sin After Sin (1977)
Stained Class (1978)
Killing Machine (1978)
British Steel (1980)
Point of Entry (1981)
Screaming for Vengeance (1982)
Defenders of the Faith (1984)
Turbo (1986)
Ram It Down (1988)
Painkiller (1990)
Jugulator (1997)
Demolition (2001)
Angel of Retribution (2005)
Nostradamus (2008)
Redeemer of Souls (2014)
Firepower (2018)

Awards and nominations and critical reception
Despite their huge, loyal fanbase, Judas Priest have never been well received by much of the music press, partially because their late 1970s rise coincided with the punk rock and new wave movements, which occupied much of the music press's attention at the time. The first edition of The Rolling Stone Album Guide gave their first three albums one star each and described the band as "for lovers of stolen Led Zeppelin riffs only". The second edition of the guide a few years later also panned their entire discography. Village Voice critic Robert Christgau was notably disdainful of the band, refusing to outright review any of their albums and relegating them to his "Meltdown" list (referring to artists he did not consider to have any material worth listening to). In 2018, they were nominated for entrance into the Rock and Roll Hall of Fame, but failed to get in, a move the band was critical of. They were however inducted into the Hall of Heavy Metal History at the Wacken festival in August 2018. Founder/CEO Pat Gesualdo thanked them "for the decades of hard work and dedication to heavy metal, an art form they helped establish." The band then stated that their induction "also sends a great message of inclusion for the metal community around the world, and keeps us defending the metal faith together." In May 2022, it was announced that the band were to be among the 2022 inductee class for the Rock and Roll Hall of Fame as the recipients of the committee selected "Award for Musical Excellence". Despite finally being inducted, many outlets, including Metal Sucks and Loudwire, were critical of the band being inducted via "Award for Musical Excellence" rather than in the "Performer" category. Halford, after originally expressing excitement about the honor, shared this sentiment.

Classic Rock Roll of Honour Awards

|-
| 2005 || Judas Priest || The Metal Guru || 

Grammy Awards

|-
| 1991 || Painkiller || Best Metal Performance || 
|-
| 1999 || "Bullet Train" || Best Metal Performance || 
|-
| rowspan= "2" | 2009 || "Visions" || Best Hard Rock Performance || 
|-
| "Nostradamus" || Best Metal Performance || 
|-
| 2010 || "Dissident Aggressor" || Best Metal Performance || 

Kerrang! Awards

|-
| 2007 || Judas Priest || Hall of Fame || 
|-
| 2015 || Judas Priest || Inspiration || 

Loudwire Music Awards

|-
| rowspan="7"|2015 || Redeemer of Souls || Metal Album of the Year || 
|-
| rowspan="2"|Judas Priest || Metal Band of the Year || 
|-
| Live Act of the Year || 
|-
| "Halls of Valhalla" || Metal Song of the Year || 
|-
| rowspan="2"|Rob Halford || Rock Titan of the Year || 
|-
| Vocalist of the Year || 
|-
| Richie Faulkner || Guitarist of the Year || 
|-
| 2017 || Rob Halford || Lemmy Lifetime Achievement Award || 

Metal Hammer Awards (Germany)

|-
|2018 || Judas Priest || Maximum Metal  || 

Metal Hammer Golden Gods Awards

|-
| 2005 || Angel of Retribution || Best Album  || 

|-
| 2011 || rowspan="2"| Judas Priest || Icons  || 
|-
| 2018 || Best British Band  || 

Metal Storm Awards

|-
| 2005 || Angel of Retribution || Best Heavy Metal Album || 
|-
| 2008 || Nostradamus || Best Heavy Metal Album || 
|-
| 2018 || Firepower || Biggest Surprise || 

Planet Rock Awards

|-
| 2019 || Firepower || Best British Album || 

Rock and Roll Hall of Fame

|-
| 2018 || Judas Priest || Performers || 
|-
| 2020 || Judas Priest || Performers || 
|-
| 2022 || Judas Priest || Performers || 
|-
| 2022 || Judas Priest || Award for Musical Excellence || 

Sweden GAFFA Awards

|-
| 2019 || Judas Priest || Best Foreign Band ||

Notes

References

Citations

Works cited 

  pbk.

External links 

 
 
 Judas Priest frontman sends message to West Midlands Police

 
1969 establishments in England
CBS Records artists
English heavy metal musical groups
Grammy Award winners
Kerrang! Awards winners
Musical groups established in 1969
Musical groups from Birmingham, West Midlands
Musical quintets
RCA Victor artists